The London Planning Advisory Committee (LPAC) was an ad hoc Londonwide joint committee responsible for strategic planning from the abolition of the Greater London Council in 1986 to the creation of the Greater London Authority in 2000. The leader was Sally Hamwee from 1986 and Nicky Gavron from 1994.

Statutory basis
The Local Government Act 1985 required the London borough councils to set up a "joint planning committee for Greater London".

The Town and Country Planning Act 1990 Section 3 (2) detailed the functions of the joint planning committee as: 
advise the local planning authorities (the London borough councils and the City of London Corporation);
inform the Secretary of State of their views; and 
inform the local planning authorities for areas near Greater London and other relevant bodies.

The London Planning Advisory Committee was serviced by Havering London Borough Council.

The joint planning committee for Greater London was abolished by Section 349 of the Greater London Authority Act 1999.

Publications
Advice on strategic planning guidance for London, 1994
Dwellings over and in shops in London, 1998
Good practice guide to community planning and development, 1995
Strategic planning advice on high buildings and strategic views in London, 1999
Sustainable residential quality: new approaches to urban living, 1998
Urban regeneration for the 1990s, 1992

References

1986 establishments in England
2000 disestablishments in England
Government agencies established in 1986
Government agencies disestablished in 2000
Greater London Council replacement organisations